Rebeca Pous del Toro (born November 1, 1974, in Barcelona, Spain), known professionally as Rebeca, is a Latin pop and Eurodance singer, producer, songwriter and actress.

Biography
She is daughter of singer Franciska, who was born in Barcelona to a Spanish mother from Valencia and a Puerto Rican father, and painter José María Pous. Eliseo del Toro, a famous Puerto Rican singer, is Rebeca's uncle.

Music career 
She started her music career in 1996, when she was 22 years old. Her first single "Más Que Un Engaño" was a big hit in Spain, Latin America and US, while the following singles "Solo Amante" and "Duro De Pelar", established her as a major artist in Spain and Latin America.

Her first album called Rebeca, a big success in Spain, Latin America and United States, sold 200 000 (+) and was certified 2xPlatinum in Spain. In 1997, she released her second album  Rebelde, which was a big success, and was certified Gold in Spain. In 1998 she worked on the album Grease en Español and in the Grease Tour until 1999. In 1999, the album Grandes Exitos was released in Latin America and USA but not in Spain. In 2000 she released the album Brava with moderate success in Latin America and Spain. In 2002, the album, Supernatural was released. She released her latest album in 2005, a greatest hits compilation called Lo Mejor De Rebeca. 

She wrote, along with Tony Sánchez-Ohlsson, Thomas G:son and Andreas Rickstrand, the song "I Love You Mi Vida" that represented Spain in the Eurovision Song Contest 2007, performed by boy band D'Nash. She attempted to participate in Eurovisión herself in four occasions: in 2006 ("Qué no daría yo"), 2007 ("I Love You Mi Vida"), 2009 ("Amor radical") and 2010 ("Valentino Boy").

Television 

In 2005, Rebeca was a contestant on reality show Aventura en África (sixth season of Survivor Spain), where she finished in fourth place. In 2014, she participated again in the thirteenth season of Survivor Spain, Supervivientes: Perdidos en Honduras. During her stay in the program, she had to be evacuated from the island due to an allergic reaction to over 200 mosquito bites at one time.

Discography 

1996: Rebeca +1 500 000
1997: Rebelde +200 000
1999: Grandes Exitos 
2000: Brava +100 000
2002: Supernatural +50 000
2005: Lo mejor de −50 000

Track-lists 

Albums:

 Rebeca (1996)
1. Solo amante 
2. Duro de pelar 
3. No hay dos sin tres 
4. Espera, chico, espera 
5. Piano, Piano 
6. Corazón, corazón  +50 000
7. Cállate ya 
8. A un paso del fin 
9. Un lugar para ti 
10. Mas que un engaño  +50 000
11. Un llanto en occidente 
12. Duro de pelar (NU-NGR MIX) Rebelde (1997)
1. Todos los chicos son igual 
2. Si tu te vas 
3. Al cien por cien 
4. Dime si me quieres 
5. Mi ciudad 
6. Locos por vivir 
7. Nada me puede parar 
8. Mensajes de amor 
9. Quien- a duo con Franciska 
10. Mundo feliz 

 Grandes Exitos (1999)
1. Duro De Pelar 
2. Dime Si Me Quieres 
3. Todos Los Chicos Son Igual 
4. Corazón, corazón 
5. Vas a ser mi amor – Ángel Ríos & Rebeca (from grease en español) 
6. Al Cien Por Cien 
7. Mas Que Un Engaño 
8. Si Tu Te Vas 
9. Noches de Verano – Edu & Rebeca (from grease en español) 
10. Piano Piano 
11. Cállate Ya 
12. Nada Me Puede Parar Brava (2000)
1. Yo Soy Buena 
2. Mi Forma de Vivir 
3. Brava 
4. Declaración de Amor 
5. Lo Que Paso Paso 
6. La Cara Oculta 
7. Noche Caliente 
8. Típico, Típico 
9. Mas Grandes Que el Amor 
10. Fiesta en Soledad 

 Supernatural (2002)
1. Tatuaje 
2. Eso no es amor 
3. Supernatural 
4. Eres tú 
5. Tócame donde más me duela 
6. Calor 
7. Sábado noche 
8. Vive 
9. De cara a la pared 
10. Simplemente amor 
11. Te esperaré Lo Mejor de Rebeca (2005)
1. Duro de Pelar [África 2005 RMX] 
2. Tatuaje 
3. Más Que un Engaño 
4. Dime Si Me Quieres 
5. Corazón, Corazón 
6. Piano Piano 
7. Si Tú Me Vas 
8. Sólo Amante 
9. Supernatural 
10. Duro de Pelar 
11. Mi Ciudad 
12. Tócame Dónde Más Me Duela 
13. Eso No Es Amor 
14. Nada Me Puede Parar 
15. Vive 
16. Calor [Remix] 
17. Quisiera 
18. Te Esperaré19. Todos Los Chicos Son Igual 
20. Más Que un Engaño [Pop Version] 
 Matador (2010) (ep digital)
1. Matador 
2. Valentino Boy 
3. Much 
4. Tu nombre 
5. Se me olvidó''

Others Songs:

 "Lo Prefiero" (unreleased)
 "Que No Daría yo"
 "I Love You Mi Vida" (unreleased)
 "Mentiras de verdad" (unreleased)
 "Sola" (unreleased)
 "Amor Radical" (unreleased)
 "Goin' you loca" (with Isaak)
 "Gloria"
 "Aquí y Ahora" EP
 "Sientes Mariposas"
 "Este Amor no se toca"
 "Hola Mariposa"
 "Because The Night"
 "I Will Survive Resistiré"

Videography 

 "Duro De Pelar" (European version)
 "Duro De Pelar" (Latin American version)
 "Cállate Ya"
 "Brava"
 "Que No Daría Yo"
 "Se Me Olvidó"
 "Valentino Boy"
 "Matador"
 "Se Hizo La Luz"
 "Aquí y Ahora"
 "Sientes Mariposas"
 "Este Amor No Se Toca"
 "I Will Survive Resistiré"

Notes

External links 
 Rebeca Official Site

Living people
1978 births
Spanish people of Puerto Rican descent
Singers from Barcelona
21st-century Spanish singers
21st-century Spanish women singers